Clink is a British television drama series, created by Colin McKeown, which premiered on 5Star on 18 April 2019. The cast include Alicya Eyo, Katherine Rose Morley, Christine Tremarco, and Lu Corfield, and focuses on the lives of the staff and inmates of the fictional women's prison, BPS Bridewell. The series is produced by LA Productions and distributed by the now-defunct Kew Media Group. McKeown serves as executive producer, while the writing team is headed by Sarah Deane.

The series went into development in late 2018, in which McKeown worked closely with the LA Productions team, in particular, Justine Potter and Donna Molloy, Head of Development and Head of Production, respectively. Filming took place from January to March 2019 in Huyton, Merseyside. Commissioned for a ten-episode first series, the show marks the first-ever original drama production commissioned for 5Star.

A second series of Clink will not be commissioned by 5Star via distribution company Kew Media Group, as it went into liquidation in 2020. It currently remains unknown if the series will return or which media service it will be commissioned for.

Premise
Set in the fictional BPS Bridewell women's prison, the series focuses on the emotional heart of a community of women who are thrown together and forced to confront their own realities and, in most cases, accept the consequences of the decisions which have brought them here. From the pregnant, scared Chloe and self-harmer, Laura, to the 'Prison Mother', Joyce, and self-styled queen of the block, Sherri, these girls are many things—drug users, robbers, some are killers, and most of them, survivors. Presiding over the women is new Governor Dominique Darby, herself thrust into a hidden world in tragic circumstances. It's her first governorship, but is she ready to cope with such a demanding job? With pressure mounting from above and below, Dominique will do battle not just with the board who appointed her, but the inmates she's charged with protecting.

Production

Development
In September 2018, it was announced that Channel 5 was moving forward with their plans to develop several scripted drama series. The project was initiated in request from Channel 5 Commissioning Executive Sebastian Cardwell followed by a ten-part series being commissioned for 5Star.

Initially, Canadian company, KEW Media Group launched Clink in Cannes after signing a three-year drama co-production partnership deal with Channel 5 in 2018.

The series was designed to appeal to a younger audience, fitting the target demographic of 5Star rather than broadcasting it on the main channel. The series creator, Colin McKeown, producer at British independent company LA Productions, serves as executive producer of Clink. The company is known for their BBC One drama series' including the long-running, Moving On, as well as their television films Reg and Care. Donna Molloy, Head of Production for LA Productions, serves as producer for the series.

Head of Development, Justine Potter, described that, being aided by charities, the people associated with the Liverpool-based drama were able to speak with former prisoner, ex-prison officers and governors, and managers of the mother-and-baby units prior to production to gather insight for character development within the series.

Writing
The writing team is headed by showrunner and scriptwriter Sarah Deane of LA Productions, while co-writers are predominantly women and include Karen Brown, Vivienne Harvey, Esther Wilson, Rebecca Manley and Helen Black. British author and screenwriter, Tony Schumacher, the only male writer of the series, had written episode three.

It was expected that the series would be compared to every other women's prison drama; however, it was never the intention to copy or imitated them. Deane said that "we want to smash a few stereotypes".

Filming
Pre-production of the series lasted ten months, and it took ten weeks to film the entire series from January to mid-March 2019. The series was produced in-house and filmed exclusively at 33 Signal Squadron Army Barracks in Huyton, Merseyside, using a Territorial Army barracks and nearby medical centre.

The show was filmed in 4K using three Blackmagic URSA Mini Pro cameras, while a skycam was used for overhead shots. The series was directed by Gary Williams, actresses Gillian Kearney and Jodhi May, and Anya Camilleri, while Tim Pollard served as director of photography. Williams said that "I used to be a DP myself for many years, and I've always been impressed by the look and skin tones that you get out of the URSA Mini Pro. I find it responds very well to light. I've used it before on numerous documentary projects and felt it translated well to drama." And that "Its latitude came into its own shooting with Blackmagic RAW. It meant much more freedom on a shoot that involved a lot of confined spaces that were especially difficult to light. Knowing that all of that detail was in the frame, to begin with, meant we could lift that information out from the blacks or the highlights and put it back during post." Each episode took up to seven days to film and the post production process was overseen by Patrick Hall of LA Productions and was edited at DaVinci Resolve Studio, while the visual effects were carried out at Fusion Studio.

Casting
Alicya Eyo, having previously appeared in the ITV prison drama Bad Girls from 1999 to 2003 as prisoner Denny Blood, was cast in the leading role of deputy governor Dominique Darby. Having worked with LA production in the past, Eyo has described it as a "very different" series with having similarities to Bad Girls. Of the series, she commented that "The fact that it's a new prison drama jumped out at me," adding that "It has a very different soul and stands alone as a show." The cast include Katherine Rose Morley of the BBC miniseries Thirteen, Lu Corfield, notable for her role in the Netflix series Sex Education, Christine Tremarco, Paul Broughton, Florence Bell, Andrew Ellis and Jennifer Hennessy.

Promotional media
During post-production of the series, Influential, a public relations and digital marketing agency launched a social media campaign to promote the series through its ten-week broadcast on 5Star in efforts to encourage viewers to watch the series live or on catch-up. Influential worked alongside 5Star's PR team by arranging exclusive interviews with cast and crew, and their key media targets which included national and trade journalists, and a feature on Radio City Talk.

Future
Following the conclusion of the first series of Clink, Channel 5 had not announced whether the series had been commissioned for a second series. In February 2020, it became clear that the series' production company Kew Media Group was in the process of liquidation. Channel 5 had already severed ties with the company, as did Endemol Shine Group. Channel 5 initially signed a three-year contract deal with Kew Media Group in September 2018 in which they fronted a large portion of the production costs towards six new dramas which Channel 5 had commissioned. Channel 5 announced that they did not expect to negotiate any further financial arrangements again.

In May 2020, Quiver Distribution acquired the rights to all titles in Kew Media's library, in which Clink has been distributed and picked up by several streaming services in countries such as UK, United States, and Australia. However, it is currently unknown if a second series will come into development through the company, or if it will ultimately be commissioned for a television network or streaming service.

Cast

Main
 Alicya Eyo as Acting wing Governor Dominique Darby
 Katherine Rose Morley as Chloe Anderson
 Christine Tremarco as Governing Governor Sinead Kovac
 Florence Bell as Laura McDermott
 Louisa Hollway as Sherri Simms
 Lu Corfield as Joyce Edevan
 Alexandra D'Sa as Amira Khan
 Paul Broughton as P.O. Brian Trent
 Theo Graham as P.O. Caleb Williams
 Jane Hazlegrove as P.O. Janine Dolan

Recurring
 Raffie Julien as Heather O'Reardon
 Trudie Goodwin as Wing Governor Alison Hayes
 Suzanne Packer as Dame Stella Regan
 Kerry Peers as Dr. Trish Wendell
 Dinita Gohli as Sami Gilani
 Natasha Jonas as Corinne Nelson
 Laura Morgan as Becky
 Lynn Kennedy as Kelso
 Teri Ann Bobb-Baxter as Idara Adoti
 Liz Hume-Daswson as Nanny Mags
 Caitlin Drabble as Inmate Jess
 Lindzi Germain as Inmate Bella
 Andrew Ellis as Lee McDermott
 Tina Malone as Elaine McDermott
 Kelli Hollis as Maggie Simms
 Liam Ainsworth as Paul Cheam
 Zora Bishop as Tanaz Barani
 Emma Bispham as Mary
 Pauline Jefferson as Theresa Trent

Guest
 Suzanne Collins as Mrs. Tranter
 Miles LaFrench as Jake Morton 
 Mike Neary as Tony Watson 
 Merrill Potts as Tania Moodie
 Neil Ashton as P.O. Hill
 Julia Haworth as Midwife Carla
 Emma Rydal as Sophie Matthews
 Sharon Byatt as Letitia May
 Steve Bell as P.O. Hughes
 Marie Crutchley as Caroline Walters
 Nicole Keri as Kesha Lascelles
 Eve Steele as Romi Martin
 Reanne Farley as Louise Cremorne
 John McArdle as Shark
 Zeb as Zeb The Dog
 Joyce Branagh as Leisa
 Simone Saunders as D.C. Thompson
 Mark Stobbart as Julian Flynn
 Shuna Snow as Judge Brinton
 Simone Sales as Niamh McGrady
 Jennifer Hennessy as P.O. Victoria Adams
 Neil Fitzmaurice as Baldwin Flowers
 Eleanor Cooke as Journalist

Broadcast
The series was broadcast on Thursday nights from April 2019 on 5Star at 9:00pm. It was available for VOD streaming on My5.

Despite being shot on 4K resolution, the series is not available to view in that format, nor is it broadcast in 1080i HDTV. The series is screened in standard definition as a HD service is not yet available from 5Star.

Series

Reception

Critical reception
The series has received mixed reviews from critics and viewers alike. In an unfavourable review for Auto Straddle, a website exclusively aimed at lesbian and bisexual women, it was stated that "Clink hopes to step into the women's prison drama gap left by Wentworth and OITNB". It went on to mention that "Whether Clink can make it that long is another matter though, with dialogue that's 95% cliché and exposition that's clunkier than a lock in a sock to the head." "Sadly, though, Clink's first episode lacks any distinction of its own, yet neither does it have the operatic melodrama of Wentworth, the campiness of Bad Girls or the nuance and quality of OITNB". In a positive review for the Liverpool Echo, Pete Price said that "City-made TV prison drama is ex-CELL-ent!" of creator and executive producer, Colin McKeown, Price mentioned that "he's [McKeown] created a series which bears all the hallmarks of an LA production—rawness, energy, humanity and truth."

In 2021, Clink was ranked at #12 in a poll on the website Ranker, featuring the "Best TV Shows About Women in Prison".

Ratings

Home media

DVD release
The series was eventually released on DVD on 8 November 2021.

Streaming
The series is available to stream in the UK and U.S. via Amazon Freevee (formerly IMDb TV), and in Australia from Seven Network's streaming service 7plus.

In November 2019, Clink was made available to stream in the United Kingdom as part of Amazon Prime Video.

See also

 Incarceration of Women
 Within These Walls (1974−1978)
 Prisoner (Prisoner: Cell Block H; 1979–1986)

References

External links
 
 
 
 

English-language television shows
Channel 5 (British TV channel) original programming
2019 British television series debuts
2010s British drama television series
2010s British crime drama television series
2010s British prison television series
2019 British television series endings
Imprisonment and detention of women
2010s British LGBT-related drama television series
Lesbian-related television shows
Television shows about drugs
Television shows set in England
Television shows set in Liverpool
British prison television series